Hebron is a historic home located near Still Pond, Kent County, Maryland.  It is a two-story brick farmhouse probably constructed in the mid to late 18th century by members of a prominent Kent County Quaker family.

It was listed on the National Register of Historic Places in 1978.

References

External links
, including photo in 1977, at Maryland Historical Trust

Houses in Kent County, Maryland
Houses on the National Register of Historic Places in Maryland
National Register of Historic Places in Kent County, Maryland